Richard Dixon, a prebendary of St Patrick's Cathedral, Dublin,  was Bishop of Cork and Cloyne from 1570 until his deprivation on 8 Nov 1571.

References

Bishops of Cork and Cloyne
16th-century Anglican bishops in Ireland